Jocara dapha is a species of snout moth in the genus Jocara first described by Herbert Druce in 1895. It is found in Colombia and Central America.

References

Moths described in 1895
Jocara